The Purcell Supergroup is composed primarily of argillites, carbonate rocks, quartzites, and mafic igneous rocks of late Precambrian (Mesoproterozoic) age. It is present in an area of about 15,000 km2 (5,800 sq. mi.) in southwestern Alberta and southeastern British Columbia, Canada, and it extends into the northwestern United States where it is called the Belt Supergroup. It was named for the Purcell Mountains of British Columbia by R.A. Daly in 1912. Fossil stromatolites and algal structures are common in some of the Purcell Supergroup rocks, and the Sullivan ore body at Kimberley, British Columbia, a world-class deposit of lead, zinc, and silver, lies within the Alderidge Formation in the lower part of the Purcell.

Spectacular outcrops of Purcell and Belt Supergroup rocks can be seen in Glacier National Park in northwestern Montana and Waterton Lakes National Park in southwestern Alberta.

Stratigraphy and lithology
The Purcell Supergroup consists primarily of argillites, carbonate rocks (limestone and dolomite), and quartzites, and includes localized occurrences of igneous rocks (mafic lava flows, tuffs, pillow basalts, and gabbroic and dioritic sills and dykes). Sedimentary structures are well preserved in the Purcell rocks despite their great age.

In the southern Canadian Rockies (Waterton Park area), the supergroup is subdivided as follows:

In the southern Purcell Mountains (Cranbrook area), the supergroup is subdivided as follows:

Environment of deposition
The Purcell Supergroup was probably deposited in subsiding deltaic to marine environments along the margin of the North American craton, possibly in an intracratonic basin where North America and another landmass were joined in a supercontinent called Columbia/Nuna. Deposition occurred during the Mesoproterozoic era, much of it probably between about 1470 and 1400 Ma (million years) ago.

Distribution and thickness
In Canada, the Purcell Supergroup is present in an area of about 15,000 km2 (5,800 sq. mi.) that reaches from the southern Purcell Mountains in southeastern British Columbia to the southern Canadian Rockies in the southwestern Alberta. It extends southward into the United States (western Montana, northern Idaho, northwestern Washington, and western Wyoming) where it is called the Belt Supergroup. It reaches a maximum thickness of more than 10,000 metres (32,000 ft) in the Purcell Mountains.

Relationship to other units
The Purcell Supergroup is equivalent to the Belt Supergroup of the northwestern United States. The base of the Purcell is not exposed in Canada, but it is inferred to rest unconformably on the Canadian Shield. The Purcell is unconformably overlain by the Neoproterozoic Windermere Supergroup in most areas, or by younger Cambrian or Devonian formations where the Windermere is absent.

Economic resources
The now-closed Sullivan Mine at Kimberley, British Columbia, worked a world-class sedimentary exhalative (SedEx) deposit that is hosted in the lower part of the Purcell Supergroup. During the life of the mine, the Sullivan ore body is reported to have yielded 8,412,077 tons of lead, 7,944,446 tons of zinc, and 9,264 tons of silver, as well as significant quantities of tin and other metals.

References

Geologic formations of Canada
Western Canadian Sedimentary Basin
Stratigraphy of Alberta
Stratigraphy of British Columbia